The 1992 Hooters 500 was the 29th and final race of the 1992 NASCAR season. It was held on November 15, 1992, at Atlanta Motor Speedway and is widely considered the greatest NASCAR race of all time, with three stories dominating the race: the debut of Jeff Gordon in the Winston Cup Series, the final race of seven-time champion Richard Petty's thirty-five-year career, and the battle for the series points championship with six drivers mathematically eligible to win the title.

The race was won by Bill Elliott in the No. 11 Budweiser Ford for Junior Johnson and Associates. The championship was won by Alan Kulwicki, driving the No. 7 Hooters Ford for AK Racing, which he also owned. Kulwicki placed second in the race, and by virtue of leading one more lap than Elliott clinched the title by securing five bonus points for leading the most laps, which enabled him to maintain a ten-point cushion he had over Elliott entering the race.

The 1992 Hooters 500 represented the 33rd running of the Atlanta fall race, and the sixth time the event was held as the NASCAR season finale.

Background
In 1992 Atlanta Motor Speedway was one of eight intermediate tracks, a track between one and two miles in length, to hold a Winston Cup Series race. The track's turns are banked at twenty-four degrees, while the front stretch, the location of the finish line, and the back stretch are banked at five.

The race, and its subsequent championship outcome, was run under the old NASCAR points system. The points system in place at the time had debuted in 1975, and the drivers would compete to accumulate the most points over the course of the entire season. The driver with the most points being awarded the series championship. This system would later be replaced by the playoff system at the start of the 2004 season.

Since each driver's point total was cumulative, this meant that if a driver had a successful season leading up to the final race, he could have already mathematically guaranteed himself the championship either by having an insurmountable points lead or enough of a points lead that all he needed to do was start the final race to guarantee himself the title. For example, Dale Earnhardt, at that time a five-time series champion, had done this three times in his career already; his 1986 and 1987 points championships were both clinched before the season's last race and in 1991 he was only required to start the finale to win.

Other seasons would regularly see two or three drivers mathematically eligible for the championship at the final race, as seen in  Rusty Wallace's championship in 1989 and Earnhardt's championship in 1990 which were both seasons in which the champion finished with a narrow margin over second place. Such a high number as six drivers was a rarity, and set a series record for most drivers eligible for the championship at the final race.

Media coverage

Television
ESPN broadcast the race to a nationwide television audience as part of its Speedworld motor racing series. Bob Jenkins was the lap-by-lap commentator with Benny Parsons and Ned Jarrett as analysts in the booth. Jerry Punch and John Kernan reported from pit road.

Radio
The race was also carried over radio by Motor Racing Network. Barney Hall & Eli Gold manned the announce position in the booth. Joe Moore reported from turns one and two, with Allen Bestwick stationed  in turns three and four. Jim Phillips, Winston Kelley, and former NASCAR driver Dick Brooks covered the action for MRN from the pit and garage areas.

Pre-race

Championship battle
Coming into the race, six drivers had a mathematical chance to win the title, the most ever. Davey Allison, driving the #28 Texaco/Havoline Ford for Robert Yates Racing, entered the race as the points leader. Alan Kulwicki, an owner-driver fielding the #7 Hooters Ford for his team, was second, followed in third by Bill Elliott, driving the #11 Budweiser Ford for Junior Johnson & Associates. Fourth place belonged to Harry Gant, the driver of the #33 Skoal Bandit Oldsmobile for Leo Jackson Motorsports. Fifth place was held by Kyle Petty, driving the #42 Mello Yello Pontiac for Felix Sabates' Team SABCO. In sixth place, and in the last position to potentially become champion, was Mark Martin, behind the wheel of the #6 Valvoline Ford for Roush Racing.

Davey Allison (leader)

Allison, coming off of a 1991 season that saw him win five times and come in third place in the final standings, picked up where he had left off in 1992 and won the season opening Daytona 500. After recording five consecutive top five finishes to open the season, Allison suffered the first of several big wrecks when he crashed out of the spring Bristol race in April. While he rebounded the next week to win at North Wilkesboro and then two races after that at Talladega, Allison would crash out of The Winston in May, suffering a bruised lung and concussion, and then, at Pocono in July, he had a violent wreck on the back stretch where the car became airborne and rotated several times; he suffered another concussion and a severely broken arm in the accident but continued to race. While he continued to race well, including winning at Michigan in June, Allison also had several finishes of thirtieth or worse due to accidents; his crew chief, Larry McReynolds, referred to this trend as “checkers or wreckers” years later. He also had to deal with a personal tragedy after his brother Clifford, driving in the Busch Series, was killed in a practice crash in August at Michigan. 

One of the places where his bad luck struck was at Darlington during the running of the Southern 500. Allison was in contention for the Winston Million after having won the Daytona 500 and Winston 500, and if he managed to win either the Coca-Cola 600 (which he did not) or the Southern 500, he would receive a $1 million bonus. The race was run under questionable weather conditions and, thanks to a crew member misreading a radar screen, Allison pitted instead of staying out with the lead; the move cost him the victory and resulted in his finishing the race in fifth while Darrell Waltrip claimed his final Cup Series win. 

After a late season series of struggles by Elliott, Allison was able to rally back into contention and when he won second to last race of the season at Phoenix, his fifth victory of 1992, he reclaimed the points lead. Entering the Hooters 500, Allison was the only driver who controlled his own destiny. Running fifth or better would clinch the title for him outright. If he led a lap, he would clinch the title with a seventh place finish or better. If Allison managed to lead the most laps, he only needed to finish eighth or better.

Allison was attempting to become the second second-generation driver to win the Winston Cup Championship - his father Bobby won the title in 1983. At the time, Lee and Richard Petty were the only father-son duo to be Cup Series champions.

Alan Kulwicki (—30)

Kulwicki entered the final race of the season with two victories, winning the spring Bristol race that Allison crashed out of and following that up with a victory in June at Pocono. While his win total was not as high as the five for Allison or the four for Elliott, Kulwicki's strength was his consistency. Entering the Hooters 500 race weekend, Kulwicki had recorded a total of sixteen top ten finishes in the twenty-eight races run to that point, ten of which were top dice finishes. In eight of the other twelve races, Kulwicki finished inside the top twenty, and he was running at the end of all but two races.

Kulwicki also had personal reasons for wanting to win the championship, as his career had nearly been derailed by Elliott’s car owner Junior Johnson. After Terry Labonte left Johnson’s team following the 1989 season, Kulwicki was asked to drive the #11 car but did not accept the offer, feeling that he needed to stay independent and work for himself. Kulwicki ran the 1990 season with Zerex Antifreeze as his sponsor, but after the season Zerex opted to pull its sponsorship after running with Kulwicki for four years. Johnson came calling again shortly thereafter, offering Kulwicki a massive contract to partner with Geoff Bodine, who replaced Labonte, in a second car for his team for 1991. Again, Kulwicki said no. Angry at being spurned twice, Johnson chose to retaliate. After signing Sterling Marlin to drive his second car, Johnson went to Kraft General Foods and convinced the company to sponsor it with their Maxwell House coffee brand. Kulwicki had been in negotiations with Maxwell House to score the sponsorship for his team, and when they backed out of the arrangement Kulwicki was forced to scramble. After a one-off sponsorship with the U.S. Army for the Daytona 500, Kulwicki qualified on pole for the spring Atlanta race in his unsponsored car. Just before the race, he made arrangements with Hooters, who had sponsored a car that did not qualify, to carry their logo on his car; this would eventually be parlayed into a long-term partnership after Kulwicki ran well. 

Kulwicki asked for and got approval from NASCAR to place two Mighty Mouse decals on the front of his car, covering the TH in “Thunderbird” so it read “Underbird”; he did this largely because he felt like, as the only driver in the championship mix running his own team, he was the underdog in the fight. Recent events would seem to support his theory; after he crashed out of the Peak Antifreeze 500 at Dover, which resulted in a 34th place finish and relegated to a 278 point deficit, Kulwicki culled together a streak of five consecutive top fifteen finishes, four of which were top fives, and climbed back into contention as the drivers ahead of him began to falter, especially Elliott.

Kulwicki, with a championship win, would become the first owner/driver since Lee Petty to win the Cup Series. In order to do this, he would have to not only outrun Allison, but keep himself ahead of the other contenders, especially Elliott; after Kulwicki ran fourth at Phoenix, he stood only ten points ahead of Elliott.

Bill Elliott (—40)
After spending his entire full-time NASCAR career with Melling Racing driving the #9 car, Elliott joined up with Junior Johnson for 1992. He was coming off of a season where he, for the first time since he became a full-time driver in Winston Cup, failed to finish in the top ten in points. The pairing bore fruit almost immediately, as the 1988 series champion added another record to his resumé. 

Despite running poorly at Daytona, Elliott went on to win the GM Goodwrench 500 at Rockingham, the Pontiac Excitement 400 at Richmond, the Motorcraft Quality Parts 500 at Atlanta earlier, and the TranSouth 500 at Darlington in consecutive weeks. This tied the NASCAR Cup Series record, which had at the time only been done four other times, the most recently by Harry Gant one season earlier.

Allison's inconsistent performance and injuries kept Elliott close enough to him in the standings and enabled him to take the championship lead into the summer months and build upon it. After the Daytona 500, Elliott did not finish outside of the top 20 in any event and recorded fourteen top tens prior to the Peak Antifreeze 500 at Dover in September. He ran second there, improving on his result from the spring when he finished 13th, and opened up what was then a 154-point lead on second place driver Allison.  

After that, however, things took a bad turn. Elliott finished 31st in a 32 car field at Martinsville a week after the Dover race after an engine failure, followed that up with a 26th place run at North Wilkesboro finishing multiple laps down, and finished 30th at Charlotte after his sway bar broke. Elliott managed to finish in the top five at Rockingham again when the series returned there in late October, and entered Phoenix with a seventy point lead over Allison. There, he was forced to withdraw after a cracked cylinder head caused his engine to fail. Allison's win combined with Elliott's 31st place finish caused a 110-point swing in the standings; Elliott left Phoenix not only trailing Allison but also Kulwicki, whose ran fourth. 

Like Kulwicki, Elliott needed to run up front and keep as much distance as he could between himself and Allison. He also needed to outrace Kulwicki due to the small gap between them in the standings. As mentioned above, he did manage to win at Atlanta when the Winston Cup drivers races their in the spring.

Harry Gant (—97)
At 52 years of age, Harry Gant was looking to become the oldest champion in Cup series history. Gant was in the middle of a late-career resurgence in 1991–1992. In September 1991, Gant won a record-tying four Cup races in a row (along with two Busch Series races), earning him the nickname "Mr. September". He finished 4th in points in 1991, and entered the 1992 season with considerable momentum.

Entering the Hooters 500, Gant had recorded a total of ten top-five finishes and fifteen top-tens. He started the season off with eight top-fives in the first 11 races, giving him an early advantage in the points standings. Gant had two wins to his credit, winning the spring race at Dover and the August race at Michigan. He was in the top four in the points standings from the spring race at Richmond through the fall race at Charlotte. After his win at Dover in June, he ranked as high as second. At the Mellow Yellow 500, despite recording another top ten finish, he was outpaced by three of his fellow contenders and slipped to fifth in points. After placing sixth at Rockingham in the penultimate race, he finished 14th at Phoenix.

Kyle Petty (—98)
Petty had an opportunity to do something no driver had ever done to that point, as if he managed to become champion Kyle would join grandfather Lee and father Richard as champion and become the first third-generation driver to do so.

Of the championship contenders, Petty's seventeen top 10 finishes were tied with Mark Martin for the most. He, like Gant and Kulwicki, had two wins to this point. The first was at Watkins Glen in August, and he won again at Rockingham in November. Nine of his finishes were in the top ten, and after he finished 29th at Dover in the spring, Petty managed to  finish no lower than fourteenth in all the events he ran from Sears Point through his second win at Rockingham. Also, like Kulwicki, Petty got hot as Elliott began his downward slide and recorded five straight finishes within the top five, starting at Dover and ending at Rockingham. A 19th place finish at Phoenix cost him some ground, but had  not ruined his chances.

Mark Martin (—113)
Martin, the furthest back of the championship contenders, was looking to win his first Winston Cup and had come close to doing so only two years earlier, finishing second to Dale Earnhardt.

After only recording one win in 1991, Martin doubled that total in 1992 with wins at Martinsville and Charlotte. His seventeen top tens, as mentioned previously, were tied with Kyle Petty for the most in the series, and eleven of those finishes were in the top five. However, he had been tripped up by a late race crash at Rockingham and lost a significant amount of ground to the points leaders. Martin's second place run behind Allison at Phoenix allowed him to gain a significant amount of those points back, as he went from 178 points back to 113. Still, he and the other two drivers in front of him would need both a win and for Allison, Kulwicki, and Elliott to have problems that would make them backmarkers. 

Of the six championship contenders, the only one that was a former Winston Cup champion was Elliott, who was the 1988 series champion. The closest former champion to Elliott in points was eighth place Darrell Waltrip, the owner-driver of the #17 Western Auto Chevrolet who was not mathematically able to win the title.

Richard Petty's Fan Appreciation Tour

Since this was the last event of the season, it also marked the final stop on Richard Petty's "Fan Appreciation Tour." On October 1, 1991, Petty announced he would retire at the end of the 1992 season. He planned on running the entire season, not just selected events, and to that point, had managed to qualify for all 28 of the events in 1992. Media coverage of Petty's final race was extensive, and the weeks leading up to the race saw considerable pre-race hype and anticipation. Ticket sales were brisk, and a record sell-out crowd was expected at Atlanta to see "King Richard" in his final event.

Under the spotlight of attention during the 1992 season, Petty's on-track results had been so far unimpressive. He had scored zero top tens, and had a best finish of 15th (three times). His most notable race of the season came at Daytona during the July 4 Pepsi 400. With President George H. W. Bush in attendance, Petty was honored during the pre-race ceremonies. He qualified on the outside of the front row, and led the first five laps of the race.

Entering the Hooters 500, Petty entered qualifying with the possibility that he might not be able to start. Having used up all of his provisional race starts during the season, he would need to qualify on time. On his first lap, Petty managed the 36th fastest time. He elected to stand on that time and not run his second round qualifying attempt, hoping that he could outlast the other drivers who were otherwise not qualified. When qualifying concluded, Petty stood in 39th position, which was enough to get him into his final race. He started on the inside of the twentieth row.  

Ceremonies to honor Petty were planned in the pre-race and post-race, and Petty was expected to take a ceremonial final lap around the track after the race to formally conclude his career. On the night before the race, Alabama held a concert honoring Petty at the Georgia Dome, with 45,000 in attendance.

On the night before pole qualifying, Richard Petty's cousin and longtime crew chief and team manager Dale Inman was robbed at gunpoint in the parking lot of the Atlanta airport. The robber tried to grab a necklace from Inman's neck, but failed. He pointed his gun and pulled the trigger, but it did not fire, and no one was injured.

Entry List
(R) denotes rookie driver
(CC#) denotes championship contender and where they rank in the standings

Qualifying

Pole qualifying
The first round of qualifying was held on Friday November 13. Rick Mast won his first career pole position in the #1 Skoal Oldsmobile for Richard Jackson Racing, the last ever pole for Oldsmobile as General Motors was withdrawing the brand from NASCAR after the race. (Mast, Gant, and Bob Schacht fielded the only Oldsmobiles in the race.)

Previously that speed had only been achieved at Daytona and Talladega. He was joined on the front row by Brett Bodine, driving the #26 Quaker State Ford for King Racing.

Under the rules at the time, the first round of qualifying locked in only the top twenty cars. In first round qualifying, all of the six championship contenders except for Harry Gant qualified. Mark Martin (4th) was the highest of the six contenders. Richard Petty was not among the top twenty. A field of 40 cars (plus at least one provisional) was expected to comprise the starting grid. With Petty sitting 36th-fastest after Friday's first round, he was precariously close to being bumped from the field on Saturday.

Source:

Second round qualifying

Second round qualifying was held on Saturday November 14. Under the rules at the time, drivers who did not qualify during the first round moved on to second round qualifying. Each driver could elect to stand on his time from the first round, or erase their time and make a new attempt. Rookie Jeff Gordon bettered his time from the day before, and became the fastest qualifier of the second round. That entered him into the wild card drawing for the 1993 Busch Clash.

Most drivers stood on their times, including Richard Petty, who held on to qualify 39th. Jimmy Hensley elected to try again, and wound up losing eleven spots on the grid. Stanley Smith, who did not even make top 40 on Friday, made a big improvement, qualifying 33rd. Smith would make only one additional NASCAR start, suffering a career-ending crash at Talladega the following season. Jimmy Horton went from only 47th-fastest on Friday, to qualify 36th. Dave Marcis also stood on his time (174.458 mph), but slipped out of the top-40. He made the field via a provisional.

*Stood on Friday time

Race

Start
A record 160,000 fans, some with seats in temporary grandstands, arrived at Atlanta Motor Speedway to witness Richard Petty's final ride, and to watch the exciting championship battle. Country Western Band Alabama sang the national anthem, then Richard Petty's son Kyle along with his sisters gave Richard the command to fire his engine one final time, while Bruton Smith gave the command to the rest of the field. Before the start of the race, four Apache helicopters did a fly-by and circled the track to salute the field.

The green flag then flew with polesitter Rick Mast in the #1 Skoal Oldsmobile for Richard Jackson Motorsports and Brett Bodine in the #26 Quaker State Ford for King Racing, battling into turn one, with Bodine leading the first lap. On lap 2, the two cars tangled, and crashed in turn one. Dale Earnhardt, the defending series champion whose reign was ending that day and who was running third in his familiar #3 GM Goodwrench Chevrolet for Richard Childress Racing, slipped by, and took over the lead. Several other cars were collected in the crash, and five of the championship contenders got through unscathed. Davey Allison, however, slowed to avoid the crash, and was tagged from behind in the left rear by Hut Stricklin's #41 Kellogg's Ford. The left rear fender was badly bent, but did not puncture the tire. Allison stayed out on the track, and the crew would be able to bend the bodywork away from the tire on the next pit stop. The cars of Rich Bickle, Wally Dallenbach Jr., and Bob Schacht were also involved but sustained only minor damage and were able to continue.

During the caution, Mark Martin ducked into the pits to change all four tires, because he was afraid he ran over debris from the incident, as well as flat-spotting the tires when he locked up the brakes and slid sideways to avoid it.

Early race
Earnhardt and Ernie Irvan, driving the #4 Kodak Chevrolet for Morgan-McClure Motorsports, traded the lead for the first 60 laps. Championship contenders Elliott, Allison, and Kulwicki ran near the top 10, while Gant, Martin, and Kyle Petty ran near the back of the pack. Richard Petty worked up to 30th.

By lap 60, entering the first round of green flag pit stops, the highest running of the championship contenders was Elliott in fifth. With the leaders in for service, Michael Waltrip spun out in the Bahari Racing #30 Pennzoil Pontiac and brought out the caution. Earnhardt and several other front runners lost a lap after being stuck on pit road. After the cycle completed under caution, four of the top five positions were filled by championship contenders. Elliott assumed the lead with Kulwicki second, Martin fourth, and Gant fifth.

However, the first significant issue for the main championship contenders struck during the pit stops. The gearbox on the #7’s transmission broke as Kulwicki tried to shift into first gear while exiting his pit stall. Thus, Kulwicki stalled on exit and had to get his crew to push him out of the box so he could get rolling. Fortunately for him, his engineering prowess and a recent incident enabled Kulwicki to adjust to at least minimize the potential issue.

Several races earlier, at the Mello Yello 500 at Charlotte, Kulwicki had the same gearbox issue that he had just experienced. To correct the issue, he upshifted into fourth gear and ran the remainder of the event in the highest possible gear. Kulwicki, who had qualified for that race on the pole, ended up running second with one of the faster cars on track that afternoon.

So, as he had at Charlotte, Kulwicki put the #7 in fourth gear and headed back out onto the track. On this day, the “Underbird” was running fast as well, so Kulwicki pressed on with the only concerns being the potential for slow pit stops and having to restart after cautions since the car could not climb through the gears as it normally would; in fact, even downshifting into second or third gear meant that pieces from the broken first gear could potentially cause damage to the transmission that might result in engine failure.

On lap 85, Bob Schacht stalled in turn 1 & another series of yellow flag pit stops had shuffled the field, bringing Allison to the lead. Martin took the lead on lap 91, which meant that now four of the championship contenders (Martin, Allison, Elliott, and Kulwicki) has secured five bonus points for leading a lap. Five of the six contenders were running well, with Gant running third behind Martin and Allison and Elliott and Kulwicki running in the top ten. Kulwicki’s car was performing extremely well despite having to run in fourth gear all day, and once up to speed it was the fastest on the track. Kyle Petty, however, was not as fortunate. The #42 developed terminal engine trouble that took him out of contention for the championship (as he would have needed to win the race and get help) and would result in his finishing near the rear of the field, multiple laps down.

Richard Petty crash
On lap 95, the #25 Kodiak Chevrolet of Ken Schrader and the #8 Snickers Ford of Dick Trickle tangled on the frontstretch. The cars spun wildly to the inside. Darrell Waltrip's #17 Western Auto Chevrolet spun to avoid the crash, and ran into the #16 Keystone Beer Ford driven by Wally Dallenbach Jr. The #45 Terminal Trucking Ford of Rich Bickle was also collected, which led to Richard Petty running into him and destroying the front end of the car, breaking the oil cooler. The oil started a fire, and Petty's car coasted to the infield in flames. Petty (who was overheard on ESPN's in-car camera shouting to the rescue crews "Bring the fucking fire extingusher!") was uninjured, however the car was badly damaged, and his return to the race was in question.

At the 100 lap mark, Allison continued to hold the hypothetical lead in the points standings, with Kulwicki second, and Elliott close behind in third.

Jeff Gordon

Around lap 118, rookie Jeff Gordon brought the #24 Chevrolet into the pits for service. The Ray Evernham-led "Rainbow Warriors" crew, which in later years would become famous for their pit stop efficiency, was nowhere near that level in this race and their errors caused Evernham to refer to them as the “Keystone Kops”. During the stop, a roll of duct tape was left on the trunk lid. As Gordon left, the roll of tape rolled onto the track, and it struck the front of points leader Allison’s Ford. The #28 suffered damage to the front air dam, which caused Allison to drop back from second place where he had been running; he would continue to battle handling issues for the rest of the race. Gordon would eventually crash out of the race on lap 164, finishing 31st.

Second half
As the race neared its halfway point, three of the six championship contenders had seen their shots at claiming the Winston Cup fall victim to bad fortune. As mentioned above, Petty's engine troubles had made his championship chase moot. Gant, who had been running in the top three earlier in the race, found himself falling further and further off the pace and would eventually go multiple laps down to end his hopes at becoming the oldest champion in Cup Series history. Finally, on lap 160, the #6 car suffered a blown engine and Martin was forced to retire from the race, leaving Allison, Elliott, and Kulwicki to race for the championship. 

As the field completed lap 167, Elliott was at the point, but Allison still held the point lead by eleven as he ran in seventh. On lap 210, Kulwicki passed Elliott to lead the race for the second time and first since lap 80. Allison had advanced to sixth and was still in position to claim the Winston Cup so long as he remained where he was running. On lap 254, though, Allison would once again find himself dealing with an on-track incident; this time, the damage would be much more significant.

Ernie Irvan, who had led twenty-four laps earlier but had since gone three laps down, lost control of the #4 exiting turn four. He narrowly avoided hitting Terry Labonte's #94 Sunoco Oldsmobile as he spun initially, then came back up the track into oncoming traffic as Allison and Rusty Wallace in the #2 Miller Genuine Draft Pontiac came out of the turn. Wallace avoided hitting the #4, but Allison was unable to do so. He T-boned the #4 before spinning out into the inside wall near the start/finish line, breaking a tie rod and locking the steering column. Although the team would begin working to get Allison back on track to finish the race once the #28 was brought back to the garage, and would eventually be successful in doing so, their championship hopes were now dashed.

Finish

The championship race was now down to a battle between the two frontrunning drivers, Kulwicki and Elliott. Although Kulwicki’s car was still running well, he and crew chief Paul Andrews also were aware of the bigger picture and thus the focus shifted away from winning the race and towards securing the championship. The best way for them to do this was to stay out in front long enough to secure the additional five bonus points Kulwicki would get if he led the most laps, and then make sure they kept the #7 as high up in the running order as they could to ensure Kulwicki would emerge as champion. Since the margin between the drivers entering the race was ten points, there was not a lot of room for error.

Forty-two laps after the restart following the Allison-Irvan wreck, Andrews radioed to Kulwicki what his plan was for his boss. Both Kulwicki and Elliott did not have enough fuel to make it to the checkered flag, so a stop would be required for both cars (Andrews had initially wanted Kulwicki to come in during the caution following the lap 254 wreck, but changed his mind after realizing that Kulwicki would have to run at least seventy laps on a tank of gas and that was not feasible). Andrews called for a fuel-only pit stop, where he would only put enough fuel in the car to ensure the #7 made it to the end. He figured that it would take approximately half of a fuel can’s load, totaling five gallons, to achieve this.

Originally, Andrews wanted Kulwicki to come in for his stop on lap 306. When word came to the team that they had almost clinched the most laps led bonus, the stop was pushed back. Kulwicki had held a two second lead over Elliott at this point, but began slowing down so he could save fuel and be sure he made it to pit road. Elliott did manage to catch Kulwicki and began racing him hard for the lead, but had trouble passing him. On lap 310, Kulwicki finally yielded and pulled off for the pits, allowing Elliott to resume the lead.

With the #11 now once again at the point, Kulwicki slowly brought the #7 to his pit stall. Car chief and gas man Tony Gibson stood waiting for his boss as he and Peter Jellen, the team’s catch can man, would be the only two team members working on the car. The rest stood by just in case Kulwicki stalled again as he had earlier. After 3.4 seconds, Kulwicki took off and headed back onto the track. However, there was an issue with the fuel relay and Gibson was unsure he got enough gas into the tank.

Meanwhile, Elliott was also in striking distance of leading the most laps. As he ran, he could not surpass Kulwicki’s total, which was 103 laps led. He could, however, equal it; if he did this, both drivers would receive the five additional points. The only way Elliott could do this is by leading every one of the remaining eighteen laps. If he did, it would force the #7 to remain within one position of the #11 if Kulwicki wanted to win the championship. Ultimately, an error in judgment rendered this scenario moot.

Elliott’s crew chief, Tim Brewer, made the same call that Andrews had done for Kulwicki; the #11 would come in, get a half-can’s worth of fuel, and get back out into the track. Elliott came in on lap 314, four laps after Kulwicki came in. The pit stop took the exact same amount of time that Kulwicki’s did, 3.4 seconds, and there were no issues. Brewer, however, had lost track of Terry Labonte, who had been running third when Kulwicki dropped off the track for his pit stop. Labonte assumed the point while Elliott was on pit road, but when Elliott came back out onto the racetrack he was too far behind the #94 to catch him before he reached the start/finish line; thus, Labonte led lap 314 and Kulwicki clinched the additional five point bonus for leading the most laps.

On lap 324, with Kulwicki having moved back into second place after Labonte came in to pit, Andrews informed him of the fuel relay issue on the final pit stop, but also told him that he had locked up the additional five point bonus. The strategy now was to conserve as much fuel as he possibly could while holding his position, as Kulwicki would be champion if he continued to run as he was. Although he was comfortably ahead of the third place driver, Geoff Bodine in Bud Moore Engineering's #15 Motorcraft Ford, as well as fourth place Jimmy Spencer, driving Bobby Allison's #12 Raybestos Ford, the possibility still existed that he could not win the championship. With Elliott looking like he was going to win the race, Kulwicki needed to make sure he finished no lower than third, since he would maintain his lead over Elliott. If both Bodine and Spencer passed Kulwicki, he would lose the championship with an Elliott victory; the drivers would end the race tied in the final standings and the first tiebreaker would be wins, which would give Elliott the championship.

Elliott would end up leading the last thirteen laps of the race and crossed the line first, getting win number five on the season and a season sweep at Atlanta. Kulwicki was able to maintain his position and conserve enough fuel to make it to the checkered flag, and he crossed the line in second to secure the championship. Kulwicki's final lead in the standings was just ten points, the closest margin in NASCAR history until the 2011 season when Tony Stewart and Carl Edwards finished in a tie for first place, with the championship going to Stewart due to him winning 5 races to Edwards' 1.

After taking one additional lap around the track, Kulwicki stopped in front of the flagstone and turned his car around. Then, as he had done in his first victory at Phoenix in 1988, he began driving around the speedway in a clockise (backwards) manner, a maneuver Kulwicki referred to as a "Polish victory lap", so he could wave to the fans. Kulwicki admitted after the race in his post-race and championship interview that he took his time coming down pit road on his final stop to make sure he didn't get a speeding penalty or stall the car again like he did on his first pit stop.

Richard Petty's crew worked diligently all afternoon to get his car running again, and with two laps remaining, Petty pulled out of the pits. His car had no sheet metal on the front end and no hood. He finished 35th, and was credited as running at the finish in his final race. Commenting on the fire, Petty said, "I wanted to go out in a blaze of glory; I just forgot about the glory part." After the victory lane celebration, Petty climbed in the car for one final ceremonial lap to salute the fans. He waved out the window while the song "Richard Petty Fans" by Alabama was played on the public address system.

Davey Allison was also running at the finish of the race as the #28 crew was able to fix the steering and tie rod damage in order to enable him to finish. He finished 43 laps down in 27th position.

Of the other contenders for the championship, Harry Gant finished the highest of them outside of Elliott and Kulwicki, finishing four laps down in thirteenth. Kyle Petty made it to lap 320 before his engine gave out, finishing sixteenth. Mark Martin’s day ended on lap 160 with a blown engine; he finished 32nd.

Immediately after the race, Junior Johnson fired Tim Brewer as the crew chief for the #11. This would be the last serious championship opportunity for the veteran owner. Elliott stayed on for two more years, winning only one additional race in the #11 in 1994. Johnson would retire from NASCAR in 1995.

Box score

Race statistics
Time of race – 3:44:20
Average speed – 133.322 mph
Margin of victory – 8.06 seconds
Lead changes – 20 among 9 drivers
Total purse: US$785,787 (winner's share $93,600)

Selected awards
Busch Pole Award: Rick Mast
Busch Beer Fastest Second round Qualifier: Jeff Gordon
Gillette Halfway Challenge: Ernie Irvan
Goody's Headache Award: Davey Allison
AP Parts Meet the Challenge Award:
True Value Hard Charger Award: Bill Elliott
Gatorade Circle of Champions Award: Bill Elliott
Plasti-kote Winning Finish Award: Tim Brewer (Elliott)
Western Auto Mechanic of the Race: Danny Glad (Kulwicki)
Unocal 76 Challenge: $22,800 available to polesitter Rick Mast – not won (rollover)

Final points standings
 Alan Kulwicki, 4078 points
 Bill Elliott, −10
 Davey Allison, −63
 Harry Gant, −123
 Kyle Petty, −133
 Mark Martin, −191
 Ricky Rudd, −343
 Terry Labonte, −404
 Darrell Waltrip, −419
 Sterling Marlin, −475

Legacy
This race is considered the transition from the old age of NASCAR to the new age. As veteran and 7 time champion Richard Petty retired, and the future 4 time champion Jeff Gordon made his cup series debut. This is also the only race in NASCAR history to feature Petty, Gordon, and Dale Earnhardt taking the green flag together. All three are considered among the best NASCAR drivers of all time. In total, nine former or future NASCAR Winston Cup champions drove in the race; Morgan Shepherd was a former Late Model Sportsman Series champion; and Mike Skinner (who failed to qualify) would eventually win the 1995 Truck Series championship – accounting for 11 NASCAR touring series champions entered in the event.

The race took place on the old "classic oval" configuration of Atlanta Motor Speedway. Later, Atlanta was re-configured to a quad-oval layout, and the start/finish line was moved to the old backstretch.

After coming up short in the championship battle, Bill Elliott's crew chief Tim Brewer was fired from Junior Johnson Motorsports. Had Elliott led the most laps, the season championship would have ended in a tie between Elliott and Kulwicki. Thus, Elliott would have been awarded the championship due to his having more wins during the season than Kulwicki (five to Kulwicki's two). This was perhaps Johnson's last hurrah as a team owner, as his cars never contended for a championship again. Despite Jimmy Spencer driving the team's #27 to two wins and Elliott recording a victory during the 1994 season, the team recorded more failure than success. Following the loss of his primary driver, Elliott, and his two sponsors, Budweiser and McDonald's, after the 1994 season, Johnson released Spencer and signed Lowe's to sponsor the #11 for one more season. He sold the operation to driver Brett Bodine in 1996 and retired.

The 1992 season was also considered Dale Earnhardt's worst season of his career, finishing outside of the top ten in points, with only one win all season. He led the race early, but pitted at a yellow and fell a lap down. After battling back to the lead lap, he brushed the wall and finished 26th.

Capping off the season with an 8th-place finish, Jimmy Hensley locked up the 1992 Rookie of the Year award. The rookie race for 1992 was mostly uncompetitive, however, as Hensley won by a large margin. All of the eligible rookies ran only partial schedules in 1992.

This was also the final race Dick Beaty served as the NASCAR director, as he retired after the 1992 season. It was also Eddie Bierschwale's final career start.

The race broke the existing ESPN auto racing television audience record, registering a 4.1 rating and 2.5 million households. It fell just short of ESPN's all-time auto racing rating record (4.2 rating/1.8 million households for the 1987 Winston 500).

Alan Kulwicki stood as the last owner-driver to win a series championship until Tony Stewart accomplished the feat in 2011. Like in 1992, the championship came down to the final race and was decided by a tiebreaker when Stewart won the race to tie Carl Edwards for the points lead and was awarded the title by virtue of his five victories versus Edwards' single victory.

Tragedy strikes in 1993
Two of the principals in the championship chase that the Hooters 500 resolved would not survive the next season. On April 1, 1993, three days before the Food City 500 at Bristol, Alan Kulwicki was killed in a plane crash along with Hooters executives, while they were flying back from an appearance at a Hooters restaurant in Knoxville, Tennessee.

A little over three months later on July 12, 1993, Davey Allison was flying his helicopter to Talladega Superspeedway to watch his friend David Bonnett (Neil Bonnett's son) test a Busch Series car. While trying to land the helicopter in a closed-in section of the Talladega infield, Allison crashed and suffered grave head injuries. He died the next morning.

Both Kulwicki and Allison were in the top five of the Cup series points at the time of their deaths, with Allison recording a victory at Richmond. Allison and Kulwicki were also invited to participate in IROC XVII based on their performances, with Kulwicki automatically qualifying as the NASCAR Winston Cup champion, and at the time of their deaths, both drivers were in the top five in IROC points. Terry Labonte and Dale Earnhardt took over for the deceased drivers and Labonte's effort in the final IROC race gave the series title to Allison posthumously.

Fifteenth anniversary
To commemorate the fifteenth anniversary of the race, Jeff Gordon served as grand marshal and Richard Petty the honorary starter for the 2007 Pep Boys Auto 500 that took place on October 28, 2007.

Further reading
Wheels of fortune: Kulwicki reigned supreme on a day when NASCAR's history took a right turn; Dave Kallmann; November 15, 2002 Milwaukee Journal Sentinel; accessed October 2, 2007.
Six Races That Changed NASCAR:  Part 3 – 1992 Hooters 500 
1992 Hooters 500: Need I say more?; Dave Kallmann (Journal Sentinel), accessed October 5, 2011.

References

Hooters 500
Hooters 500
NASCAR races at Atlanta Motor Speedway
Hooters 500